Anhangueria (or anhanguerians) is a group of pterosaurs belonging to the clade Pteranodontoidea. Fossil remains of this group date back from the Early to Late Cretaceous periods (Valanginian to Turonian stages), around 140 to 92.5 million years ago. Anhangueria was named by paleontologists Taissa Rodrigues and Alexander Kellner in a review of Ornithocheirus species in 2013, they defined the clade as a branch-based taxon consisting of all pteranodontoids more closely related to Anhanguera blittersdorffi than to Istiodactylus latidens and Cimoliopterus cuvieri.

Classification
Anhangueria originally only contained the genera Brasileodactylus, Camposipterus, Cearadactylus, Ludodactylus as well as the family Anhangueridae, however, recent analyses had recovered the family Hamipteridae within this clade as well.

In 2014, paleontologist Brian Andres and colleagues assigned more groups and genera within this clade, this included Guidraco, the subfamily Boreopterinae, and the clade Ornithocheirae, which was further divided into the families Anhangueridae and Ornithocheiridae. This topology was later followed by a few other studies. The cladogram of the phylogenetic analysis by Andres and colleagues is shown below:

Later, in 2019, a different phylogenetic analysis, this time conducted by Borja Holgado and colleagues, focused on derived pterodactyloids with particular emphasis on anhanguerians. In this analysis, Anhangueria consisted of Camposipterus and the families Anhangueridae and Hamipteridae, the clade Ornithocheirae was recovered as a more inclusive group consisting of Ornithocheirus and Cimoliopterus as basal members, as well as the Anhangueria in the most derived position. This classification is supported by the expansion of the premaxillary tip (a spoon-like expansion at the end of the snout) with a high jaw end. Many analyses afterwards have followed this concept, although some had recovered Camposipterus outside the Anhangueria (within the clade Targaryendraconia), but still within the Ornithocheirae. The cladogram of the analysis by Holgado and colleagues in shown below:

References

Pteranodontoids
Early Cretaceous first appearances
Late Cretaceous extinctions